Reigersbos is an Amsterdam Metro station in the Gaasperdam area of Amsterdam, Netherlands. The station opened in 1982 and is served by 2 lines, the 50 (Isolatorweg - Gein) and 54 (Amsterdam Centraal - Gein).

The metro station is only accessible with an OV-chipkaart, GVB Travel Pass or paying by cash.

Bus service

 47 Station Bijlmer ArenA - Bijlmermeer - Gaasperplas - Gaasperdam - Station Holendrecht - Holendrecht AMC

References

External links
GVB website 

Amsterdam Metro stations
Amsterdam-Zuidoost
Railway stations opened in 1982
1982 establishments in the Netherlands
Railway stations in the Netherlands opened in the 20th century